The Adirondack Phantoms were a professional ice hockey team in the American Hockey League (AHL), who began play in the 2009–10 AHL season. The Phantoms were based in Glens Falls, New York, playing home games at the Glens Falls Civic Center and were the AHL affiliate of the NHL's Philadelphia Flyers. The franchise moved to Glens Falls from Philadelphia, where they were known as the Philadelphia Phantoms from 1996 to 2009 in the Flyers' former arena, the Spectrum.

Beginning in the 2014–15 season, the team moved to Allentown, Pennsylvania, and are now known as the Lehigh Valley Phantoms.

History
In 2008, Comcast Spectacor announced that the Wachovia Spectrum, the Phantoms' home since 1996, was going to be demolished to make way for Philly LIVE, a project which included a luxury hotel and entertainment district. On February 4, 2009, it was announced that Comcast Spectacor has reached an agreement to sell the Phantoms to the Brooks Group of Pittsburgh. On April 28, 2009, it was announced by the AHL's board of governors that approval had been given for the Brooks Group to officially move the Phantoms to Glens Falls. The Phantoms would be the second American Hockey League team to play in Glens Falls, New York, after the Adirondack Red Wings from 1979 to 1999.

On December 4, 2009, the Phantoms returned to Philadelphia to play a home game. The Phantoms lost 2–1 in overtime to the Norfolk Admirals at the Wachovia Center. The Phantoms played in Philadelphia again on January 21, 2011, against the Wilkes-Barre/Scranton Penguins at the Wells Fargo Center. The Phantoms won by a score of 4–2. The Phantoms returned to Philadelphia a third time on January 6, 2012, where they took part in the third annual AHL Outdoor Classic.  They hosted the Hershey Bears at Citizens Bank Park, four days after the ballpark hosted the Flyers and New York Rangers in the NHL Winter Classic. This was the third outdoor AHL game, but the first to include the Phantoms who won 4–3 in overtime.  It also marked the first time an outdoor AHL game was included in the Winter Classic festivities.

In March 2011, plans were announced for the PPL Center to be built in Allentown, Pennsylvania. The arena, located in downtown Allentown, takes up the entire block between Seventh and Eighth streets and Hamilton Boulevard and Linden Street. Demolition at the arena site began in January 2012. In February 2012, it was announced the Phantoms would return to Pennsylvania in 2013–14. However, due to construction delays on the new arena it was pushed back to 2014–15 and the franchise began play as the Lehigh Valley Phantoms.

Season-by-season results

Records as of April 20, 2014.

Players

Team captains
Jared Ross, 2009–10
Dan Jancevski, 2010–11
Ben Holmstrom, 2011–14

Team records

Single season
Goals: Jon Matsumoto, 30 (2009–10)
Assists: Erik Gustafsson, 44 (2010–11)
Points: Jason Akeson, 64 (2013–14)
Penalty minutes: Zac Rinaldo, 331 (2010–11)
GAA: Michael Leighton, 2.22 (2010–11)
SV%: Michael Leighton, .926 (2010–11)
Wins: Michael Leighton, 28 (2011–12)
Shutouts: Michael Leighton, 5 (2010–11)

Goaltending records need a minimum of 25 games played by the goaltender

Career
Career goals: Jason Akeson, 58
Career assists: Jason Akeson, 114
Career points: Jason Akeson, 172
Career penalty minutes: Brandon Manning, 447
Career goaltending wins: Michael Leighton, 43
Career shutouts: Michael Leighton, 7
Career games: Ben Holmstrom, 256

Head coaches
Greg Gilbert, 2009–10
John Paddock, 2010
Joe Paterson, 2010–12
Terry Murray, 2012–14

See also
List of Adirondack Phantoms players

References

 
Defunct ice hockey teams in the United States
Defunct sports teams in New York (state)
Ice hockey teams in New York (state)
Ice hockey clubs established in 2009
Ice hockey clubs disestablished in 2014
Sports in Glens Falls, New York
Philadelphia Flyers minor league affiliates
2009 establishments in New York (state)
2014 disestablishments in New York (state)